Union City is a ghost town in Madison County, Montana, United States. Its elevation is 7,582 feet (2,311 m), and it is located at  (45.2082579, -111.9424776).

Founded in 1867 as a mining camp, the community was abandoned after the claims ran out. The entire site, now owned by the Bureau of Land Management, was added to the National Register of Historic Places in 1999.

References

Populated places established in 1867
Ghost towns in Montana
Geography of Madison County, Montana
1867 establishments in Montana Territory
National Register of Historic Places in Madison County, Montana
Bureau of Land Management areas in Montana